Kryptopterus minor is a small species of Asian glass catfish from the Kapuas River basin in Borneo, Indonesia. Until 2013, the ghost catfish (K. vitreolus) was included in K. minor. The true K. minor is rarely (if ever) seen in the aquarium trade, while K. vitreolus is common.

References

Siluridae
Freshwater fish of Indonesia
Fish described in 1989